KKMC (880 kHz) is a commercial AM radio station broadcasting a Christian talk and teaching radio format.  Licensed to Gonzales, California, it serves the Salinas-Monterey and Santa Cruz areas of Central California.  The station is owned by El Sembrador Ministries.

KKMC is powered at 10,000 watts.  Because 880 AM is a clear channel frequency, KKMC uses a three-tower array directional antenna to avoid interference.  The transmitter is off Jacks Road in Gonzales.  Programming is also heard on 10 watt FM translator K247BL in Salinas, California.

Programming
KKMC has a schedule of national and local religious leaders.  The station is brokered, with hosts paying KKMC for time on the air.  During their programs, they may seek donations to their ministries.  Hosts include Charles Stanley, Chuck Swindoll, Joni Eareckson-Tada, Joyce Meyer, J. Vernon McGee and Jim Daly.  Secular shows include Dave Ramsey and Alex Jones.

History
On September 22, 1984, KKMC first signed on.  It was owned by Monterey County Broadcasters with studios on East Alisal Street in Salinas. It has always aired a Christian radio format.

References

External links

KMC